The Hongdu GJ-11 Sharp Sword is an unmanned combat aerial vehicle developed in the People's Republic of China for the People's Liberation Army. It was designed by Shenyang Aircraft Design Institute and Hongdu Aviation Industry Group (HAIG), with the latter being the manufacturer. The GJ-11 may also perform aerial reconnaissance.

Design
The GJ-11 is a tailless flying wing with two internal weapons bays. Stealth features include the shaping of the rear airframe around the engine exhaust and serrated weapon bay doors.

Development
Early versions were less stealthy with an exposed engine nozzle.

Images of the aircraft's first flight appeared on the Internet in November 2013..

In October 2021, Aviation Industry Corp of China (AVIC) showcased the GJ-11 at Airshow China. The drone is reportedly capable of taking off autonomously from Type 075 amphibious assault ships. The stealthy drone could deploy swarming air-launched decoys or electronic warfare systems, in addition to launching precision-guided munitions.

In October 2022, Chinese media showcased the computer-generated concepts of three GJ-11 being controlled by a two-seat variant of the Chengdu J-20 fighter jet, akin to the Loyal Wingman program of the United States.

Specifications

References

Stealth aircraft
GJ-11
Unmanned military aircraft of China
Aircraft first flown in 2013
Single-engined jet aircraft
Unmanned stealth aircraft
People's Liberation Army Air Force